Roger Lebel (June 5, 1923 – June 18, 1994) was a Canadian actor.

Career 
Label was born in Rivière-du-Loup, Quebec, Canada. A Québécois character actor, Roger Lebel began his career on stage and in radio. He started to show up movies in the mid-1950s, and had supporting roles in important Quebec films such as La Mort d’un bûcheron, Réjeanne Padovani, Gina, Les Bons Débarras and Un Zoo la nuit. He won the Genie Award for best supporting actor in Un Zoo, as the dying father, his last screen appearance.

Films 
1952: The Bird Fancier (L'Homme aux oiseaux)
1958: Les Mains nettes - Ernest Rivard
1961: Dubois et fils
1972: Double-sens
1973: The Death of a Lumberjack (La Mort d’un bûcheron) - Paper employee union archivist
1973: Réjeanne Padovani - Leon Desaulniers
1974: Bingo - Champagne
1974: Gina - Léonard Chabot
1975: The Vultures (Les Vautours) - Armand Bouchard / le député de Limoilou
1976: Let's Talk About Love (Parlez-nous d’amour) - Boss de Jeannot
1976: The Absence (L'Absence)
1977: Panic (Panique)
1980: Good Riddance (Les bons débarras) - Maurice
1980: The Coffin Affair (L’Affaire Coffin) - Pascal Dion
1984: The Years of Dreams and Revolt (Les Années de rêves) - Le député Armand
1984: Laurier (TV Mini-Series) - Sir Richard J. Cartwright
1984: The Crime of Ovide Plouffe (Le Crime d’Ovide Plouffe)
1987: Night Zoo (Un zoo la nuit) - Albert

External links 
 

1923 births
1994 deaths
Canadian male film actors
Canadian male television actors
People from Rivière-du-Loup
French Quebecers
Male actors from Quebec
20th-century Canadian male actors
Best Actor Genie and Canadian Screen Award winners